Khagaria district is an administrative district in the state of Bihar in India. The district headquarters are located at Khagaria. Earlier it was a part of Munger District as a sub-division that was created in 1943–44. It was upgraded to the status of a district on 10 May 1981. Khagaria district is a part of Munger Division.

The present collector and District Magistrate of Khagaria is Alok Ranjan Ghosh and the current S.P of Khagaria is Amitesh Kumar, IPS 2016 batch.

Geography
The district is surrounded by seven rivers namely Ganges, Kamla Balan, Koshi, Budhi Gandak, Kareh, Kali Koshi and Bagmati. These rivers cause floods every year which causes great loss of life and property including livestock. River Ganga forms the southern boundary of the district. Khagaria experiences an extreme climate with very hot summers and extremely cold winters. Rainy season continues up to October with heavy rainfall causing the rivers to overflow and causing floods in most regions.

Politics 
  

|}

Administration

Sub-divisions
Khagaria district comprises two sub-divisions:

2.Gogri

Blocks
Khagaria district has been divided into 7 blocks:

Economy
In 2015 union Food processing minister Harsimrat Kaur Badal laid the foundation stone of a mega food at Mansi block. This will provide benefit to 30000 and generate around 6000 direct and indirect jobs.
In 2006 the Ministry of Panchayati Raj named Khagaria one of the country's 250 most backward districts (out of a total of 640). It is one of the 36 districts in Bihar currently receiving funds from the Backward Regions Grant Fund Programme (BRGF).

Transport
Khagaria is a small town with a major railway junction on the Barauni Guwahati section of the Indian Railways. National Highway No.31, which connects rest of India to North Eastern region passes through this town. It is also connected to other regions of north Bihar by another rail line to Saharsa and Samastipur. A major rail bridge across river Ganges at Munger connects it to south Bihar and Jharkhand directly.

Demographics

According to the 2011 census Khagaria district has a population of 1,666,886, roughly equal to the nation of Guinea-Bissau or the US state of Idaho. This gives it a ranking of 300th in India (out of a total of 640). Its population growth rate over the decade 2001-2011 was 29.46%. Khagaria has a sex ratio of 883 females for every 1000 males, and a literacy rate of 60.87%. 5.23% of the population lives in urban areas. Scheduled Castes and Scheduled Tribes make up 14.83% and 0.04% of the population respectively.

At the time of the 2011 Census of India, 29.28% of the population in the district spoke Hindi and 5.90% Urdu as their first language. 64.46% of the population speaks languages classified as 'Others' under Hindi in the census. The local language is Angika, sometimes seen as a Maithili dialect.

Goddess Durga temple  
Mother Durga's temple is situated in sanhouli, adjacent to Khagaria city for decades. A large number of pilgrims perform religious rituals worshiping here. In addition to various parts of the state, devotees of Assam, Uttar Pradesh etc. States also come here to offer prayers and offerings in mother's court.

References

External links
 Official website
 Khagaria Information Portal
 goddess durga temple in khagaria/

 
Munger division
Districts of Bihar